HD 202259 is a suspected variable star in the equatorial constellation of Aquarius. With an apparent magnitude of 6.39, according to the Bortle scale it is faintly visible to the naked eye from dark rural skies. It has a stellar classification of M1 III, and is a red giant located along the asymptotic giant branch of the HR diagram. Located about 900 light years away, its radial velocity of −123.5 km/s indicates this is a high-velocity star.

References

External links
 Image HD 202259

Aquarius (constellation)
202259
M-type giants
8121
Suspected variables
104872
Durchmusterung objects